The 2005 FIBA Africa Women's Clubs Champions Cup (11th edition), was an international basketball tournament  held in Bamako, Mali, from October 2 to 9, 2005. The tournament, organized by FIBA Africa and hosted by Djoliba AC, was contested by 8 clubs split into 2 groups, all of which qualifying for the knock-out stage (quarter, semis and final).
 
The tournament was won by home team Djoliba AC which qualified for the 2007 FIBA Women's World League.

Draw

Squads

Qualification

Preliminary rounds 

Times given below are local UTC.

Group A

Group B

Knockout stage

Quarter-finals

5th-8th place

Semifinals

7th place

5th place

Bronze medal game

Gold medal game

Final standings

Djoliba AC rosterAminata Seremé, Aminata Sininta, Djenaba Samake, Djénébou Damba, Fanta Toure, Fatoumata Dia, Fatoumata Konate, Fatoumata Sanfo, Kadiatou Touré, Kadidiatou Drame, Mariama Camara, Meiya Tirera Coach: Mohamed Maïga

Statistical Leaders

All Tournament Team

See also
 2005 FIBA Africa Championship for Women

References

External links 
 Championship Official Website
 

2005 FIBA Africa Women's Clubs Champions Cup
2005 FIBA Africa Women's Clubs Champions Cup
2005 FIBA Africa Women's Clubs Champions Cup
FIBA